Zinc finger protein 510 is a protein that in humans is encoded by the ZNF510 gene.

Function

This gene encodes a krueppel C2H2-type zinc-finger protein family member. The encoded protein is expressed in several cancer cell types and may be a biomarker for early diagnosis of these cancers.

References

Further reading